Benjamin Glover Shields (January 9, 1811 – November 15, 1892) was an American politician and a member of the United States House of Representatives from Alabama.

Early life
Shields was born at his family's plantation in Abbeville, South Carolina on January 9, 1811.  He was a son of Milley Harris Glover Shields and Samuel Bayard Shields. His father was originally from Newcastle County, Delaware, but his maternal grandfather was a wealthy planter from Abbeville.

He later moved with his father to Clarke County, Alabama, and later resided at Demopolis, Alabama, in Marengo County where he completed preparatory studies, before entering Franklin College in Athens, Georgia.

Career
Shields became a member of the Alabama House of Representatives in 1834.

Between March 4, 1841, and March 3, 1843, he served as a Democrat in the Twenty-seventh Congress. In 1845, he was commissioned by President James K. Polk as United States Chargé d'Affaires to Venezuela. He remained in this position until January 7, 1850.

Upon returning to the United States, he became an opponent of secession, ran unsuccessfully for Governor as a Union Democrat.

After the U.S. Civil War, Shields moved to Texas and became one of the few Republicans in Texas. From 1874 to 1879, he served as U.S. Collector of Customs at the Port of Galveston.

Personal life
In April 1832, Shields was married to Sarah Thomas Harwell, a daughter of Dr. Ishmael P. Harwell.  He died at his home near Marlin, Texas on November 15, 1892, as a result of a cold he caught while riding in the rain to cast his vote for president on behalf of Benjamin Harrison and for governor on behalf of Jim Hogg.

References

External links
 

1811 births
1892 deaths
Democratic Party members of the Alabama House of Representatives
19th-century American diplomats
Ambassadors of the United States to Venezuela
People from Abbeville, South Carolina
People from Demopolis, Alabama
Democratic Party members of the United States House of Representatives from Alabama
19th-century American politicians